The Cross Britain Way is a hiking trail of  across England and Wales. Its starting point is Boston on the east coast of England and it finishes in Barmouth on the Welsh coast (or vice versa). It was launched in September 2014 and is one of the Macmillan Ways, a group of paths created to raise funds for Macmillan Cancer Support.  It is fully waymarked, and a comprehensive guidebook comprising route directions, maps, photographs and an accommodation list has been published and can be obtained from Macmillan Ways Association.

The path is recognised by the Long Distance Walkers Association.

The terrain varies from the flat land of The Fens to the Welsh Berwyn Mountains.

References

External links
Cross Britain Way on Macmillan Ways website, including map showing route

Long-distance footpaths in Wales
Long-distance footpaths in England
Footpaths in Lincolnshire
Footpaths in Leicestershire
Footpaths in Staffordshire
Footpaths in Shropshire
2014 establishments in England